Henry John Wardell  (1890–1972) was a notable New Zealand pastoralist, businessman and wool industry leader. He was born in Dunedin, New Zealand, in 1890.

In the 1960 New Year Honours, Wardell was appointed a Companion of the Order of St Michael and St George, in recognition of his service as chairman of the New Zealand Wool Board.

References

1890 births
1972 deaths
New Zealand farmers
Businesspeople from Dunedin
New Zealand Companions of the Order of St Michael and St George